Alan McCullough is a television writer.

He is most noted for his contributions to the Stargate SG-1 and Stargate Atlantis television series. He joined the Stargate production team at the start of the show's ninth season in 2005. Since then he has been a writer for the series.

He currently resides in Toronto, Ontario.

External links

Living people
Canadian television writers
Canadian male television writers
Year of birth missing (living people)
Place of birth missing (living people)